Francois Theodorus "Tabbie" du Plessis (born 10 December 1992 in Bethlehem) is a South African rugby union player. His regular position is hooker.

Career

Youth

In 2010, Du Plessis was part of the  squad that played in the Under-19 Provincial Championships. He also played club rugby for amateur side Bethlehem Oud-Skoliere (Bethlehem Old Boys).

Eastern Province Kings

However, he was not retained for the Kings' Currie Cup campaign and he returned to playing club rugby in the Free State.

Personal

Du Plessis is the younger brother of Springboks Bismarck and Jannie.

References

South African rugby union players
Living people
1992 births
Eastern Province Elephants players
Rugby union hookers
Rugby union players from the Free State (province)